Lewisville is a Neighbourhood in the city of Moncton, New Brunswick.

History
See also History of Moncton and Timeline of Moncton history
 James Lewis and Sevil Lewis settled here in 1866. In 1898 Lewisville had a population of 200.  

 Lewisville was officially amalgamated into the city of Moncton in 1973.

Places of note

Bordering communities

See also

List of neighbourhoods in Moncton
List of neighbourhoods in New Brunswick

References

Neighbourhoods in Moncton
Populated places disestablished in 1973
Former municipalities in New Brunswick